Coro is an American non-partisan, non-profit organization best known for its fellowship program dedicated to teaching skills useful in leadership in public affairs to young adults.

The organization was founded in San Francisco in 1942 by W. Donald Fletcher, an attorney, and Van Duyn Dodge, an investment counselor. Their premise was based on the realization that, unlike law, business or medicine, post graduate training in the area of leadership was non existent, and they wanted to train young veterans in the leadership skills necessary to assure that our democratic system of government could more effectively meet the needs of its citizens.

Contrary to the assumption that "Coro" refers to the word "core," the name is a nonce word created to represent "both discovery and exploration."

Coro Fellows Program in Public Affairs 

The Coro Fellows Program in Public Affairs, the organization's premier fellowship, is a full-time, nine-month, graduate-level experiential leadership training program that prepares diverse, talented and committed individuals for effective and ethical leadership in the public affairs arena. Unconventional by traditional academic standards, the Fellows Program is rigorous and demanding, aiming toward personal and professional growth. The Fellows Program is offered in Los Angeles, New York, Pittsburgh, San Francisco and St. Louis.
Coro introduces program participants to all aspects of the public affairs arena, preparing them to translate their ideals into action for improving their own communities and beyond. The fellowship comprises field placements, group interviews, seminars, focus weeks, and individual and group projects.

Sixty Fellows are chosen nationally each year through a highly competitive selection process, including a day-long assessment at each center's city. The Fellows represent a broad range of academic, work, cultural, racial and economic backgrounds, ages and interests. What they share is an unwavering commitment to civic engagement. Recent participants have ranged from 21 to 53 years of age.

Coro Exploring Leadership Program 

The Coro Exploring Leadership Program is offered in multiple cities, including Oakland, New York, and San Francisco. Launched in 1998, Exploring Leadership (EL) is a full-time summer and part-time academic year program that prepares high school juniors for opportunities in the 21st century workforce and higher education by engaging them to become active citizens and to improve their communities.

Community and regional programs 
Each Coro location has developed a variety of full and part-time, community and regionally based programs aimed at leadership training.

The Neighborhood Leadership Programs at Coro Southern California, the Coro Leadership Center – St Louis, and Coro Pittsburgh works with emerging and established leaders in specific geographic neighborhood. Program participants identify local issues in their community and then work with Coro trainers to develop and carry out innovative and proactive solutions.

The Public Allies program at the Coro Center for Civic Leadership advances the skills, networks and experience of diverse young leaders as they strengthen communities, nonprofits and civic participation.  Program participants complete a 10-month apprenticeship at a nonprofit organization while also undergoing leadership training and completing a team service project.

The Women in Leadership program at the Coro Center for Civic Leadership Pittsburgh and at FOCUS St. Louis provides an opportunity for women to refine their personal and professional management leadership skills in order to increase their effectiveness as leaders in the Pittsburgh and St. Louis metropolitan areas.

Cleveland Executive Fellowship - A Coro Program funded by the Cleveland Foundation is a full-time one-year, immersion fellowship to  develop individuals who can serve as Northeast Ohio's future leaders. Coro National and the Cleveland Foundation launched the fellowship with the ultimate goal of creating a pipeline of civic leaders who can problem solve across traditional boundaries, work with diverse communities and make the civic arena work through networks and collaboration.

Leadership New York at the Coro New York Leadership Center and Leadership Southern California at Coro Southern California are executive-level programs conducted in partnership with local organizations in each city. These mid-career professionals come together to examine and address the most pressing regional issues in their communities.

Coro New York Leadership Center also conducts Immigrant Civic Leadership Program which strengthens the ability of leaders in immigrant communities to mobilize immigrant participation in key decision-making processes.

The Coro Community Leadership Program offers working professionals and active retirees the opportunity to strengthen their leadership skills, network with a diverse group of Bay Area leaders, and learn about and contribute to community and civic leadership in the Bay Area.

The Emerging Leaders in Public Affairs (ELPA) program at the Coro Center for Civic Leadership is aimed at positioning participants for increased involvement in the electoral process as ethical and effective candidates, campaign staffers, board members, appointees and/or community advocates.

Coro Southern California's Health Leadership Program “HLP” is a premier leadership training experience that uses collaborative approaches to prepare a multi-cultural, professionally diverse group of professionals dedicated to improving the quality and accessibility of healthcare in Los Angeles County.

Coro Center for Civic Leadership's Regional Internship Center strives to increase the number of organizations in Southwestern Pennsylvania offering internships by actively working with employers to develop programs and connect them with potential interns.

Locations 

In addition to San Francisco, centers under the Coro umbrella exist in Los Angeles (1957), St. Louis (1972), Kansas City (1975), New York (1980), and Pittsburgh (1999). In 2005, Coro partnered with the Cleveland Foundation to establish a new Executive Fellows program in Cleveland. Although each location is independently run, they are connected by Coro National, a 501(c)(3) governing body.  The Coro National Alumni Association is also a freestanding non-profit (incorporated 1990) that supports nearly 10,000 alumni worldwide.

Notable alumni

Approximately 1,000-1,200 people participate in Coro's various programs each year, many of whom work in non-profit organizations, businesses, and government agencies. Some notable alumni who currently hold or have held public office include:

 Phil Angelides, former treasurer, State of California (LA '75)
 Marvin R. Baxter, associate justice, Supreme Court of California (SF '63)
 Michael Bennet, member, U.S. Senate, Colorado (NY '88)
 Jeffrey Bleich, U.S. Ambassador to Australia (StL '84)
 Debra Bowen, secretary of state, State of California (LA '89)
 Ben Cannon, education adviser, Governor's Office, Oregon and former member, Oregon House of Representatives (StL '00)
 Helen Dewar, former staff writer, The Washington Post (SF'58)
 Anna Eshoo, member, U.S. House of Representatives (SF '79)
 Vic Fazio, former member, U.S. House of Representatives (LA '66)
 Dianne Feinstein, member, U.S. Senate, California (SF '56)
 Tim Kaine, vice presidential nominee, member, U.S. Senate, and former governor, Virginia (KC '78)
 Jerry Lewis, former member, U.S. House of Representatives (SF '57)
 Mike Levin, member, U.S. House of Representatives (LA '02)
 Carol Liu, member, California State Senate (LA '89)
 Holly Mitchell, member, California State Assembly (LA '87)
 John B. Mockler, state secretary of education, California (CA '63)
 Adrin Nazarian, member, California State Assembly
 Alex Padilla, member, U.S. Senate, California (LA '95)
 Jean Quan, mayor, City of Oakland, California (SF '87)
 Gene Siskel, former film critic, Siskel & Ebert At the Movies (LA '68)

References

External links 
 Official site
 Coro National Alumni Association

Leadership